The Washington Post is a daily newspaper published in Washington, D.C., United States.

Washington Post may also refer to:

Graham Holdings Company (formerly The Washington Post Company), the former owners of the above newspaper
"The Washington Post" (march), a march by John Philip Sousa

See also
Washington (disambiguation)
Post (disambiguation)